Big Mama may refer to:

Arts and music
Big Mama (film), a 2000 Oscar-winning American film about grandparents raising their grandchildren
Big Mama (band), a band of four female pop/R&B singers in South Korea
Big Mama, a character in the 1981 film The Fox and the Hound
Big Mama, a character in the anime and manga series Sorcerer Hunters
Big Mama, a nickname of EVA in Metal Gear Solid 4: Guns of the Patriots
Big Mama, a nickname of Josephine Joseph, matriarchal character in the Soul Food film and television series
"Big Mama (Unconditional Love)", a song by LL Cool J from his 2002 album 10
Big Mama Thornton (1926–1984), American blues singer

Other
Big Mama, a name for Mary, mother of Jesus in the Mama Tata religion
Big Mama, a nickname of JoAnne Carner, former LPGA golfer
Big mama, a colloquial name for Internet censors on web bulletin boards in the People's Republic of China

See also
Big Momma's House, a 2000 series of American comedy films
Chinese dama, a term that refers to Chinese middle-aged women